Spring and autumn landscapes is a pair of paintings representing spring and autumn by Japanese artist Hara Zaishō (1813–1872). It is part of the permanent collection of the Royal Ontario Museum, Toronto, Canada.

Hara Zaishō
Hara Zaishō (原在照) was the adopted son of Hara Zaimei (原在明), whom he succeeded as the third head of the Hara School of professional painters. Based in Kyoto, the Hara School served from the late eighteenth through the early twentieth centuries as official artists to the Imperial Court. Hara Zaishō contributed several pieces to the Kyoto Imperial Palace during its reconstruction following a fire in 1854. The most famous of these is a cherry tree motif painted on sliding fusuma doors in the Sakura-no-ma (Cherry Blossom Room).

Zaishō’s career spanned the late Edo (1603-1867) and early Meiji (1868-1912) periods, a time of great change within Japan as a result of its 1854 opening to the West. The Hara School was aligned with the Maruyama School of painters, a movement founded in the late 18th century associated with western-influenced tendencies such as objective realism, unified perspective, shading and contouring.

Hara Zaishō is also used the art names Kanran (観瀾) and Yūran (夕鸞).

Genre

These two paintings belong to the tsukinami-e genre: images depicting changing landscapes through the seasons. It was not uncommon for tsukinami-e to take the form of diptychs, with the entire year represented by images of spring and autumn. The pair is read from right to left, with spring preceding autumn.

These landscapes are sumi-e—ink paintings—done on silk, a relatively expensive medium reflecting the status of the artist and patron. They are mounted as kakejiku or kakemono, vertical hanging scrolls. This type of painting would typically be hung in a tokonoma alcove, sometimes foregrounded by a seasonal flower arrangement and decorative incense burner. Kakemono were intended to be viewed while frontally seated at the distance of a tatami mat width (approximately 90 cm). Although kakejiku were objects of decoration, their lack of elaboration reflects their secondary purpose as objects to stimulate quiet contemplation.
 
This pair of paintings belongs to a period in Japanese art during which depictions of landscape were undergoing reconsideration.  Faced with Japan’s emergence as a nation on the world stage, artists were moving away from classical Chinese conventions to develop a more nativized system of symbolic motifs, and treatments of space. The cherry blossoms in the spring image and the thatched roof in the autumn landscape tie Zaishō’s works to contemporary Japan rather than to ancient China.

Style and content
Spring Landscape features a full moon shining above a solitary cherry tree in full bloom planted on the slope of a mountain. It retains the monochrome style with its refined Chinese associations, but adds sparing use of colour in the slight pink of the cherry blossoms, symbolic of spring, of transience and of Japan itself.

In Autumn Landscape, Zaishō again depicts a mountain scene, an environment classically associated with the sacred. Here, the slopes are flanked by pine trees, often invoked as symbols of longevity and steadfastness in counterpoint to the fleetingness of spring’s cherry blossoms.

Head artists of the Hara School
 Hara Zaichū (原在中) 1750 – 1837
 Hara Zaimei (原在明) 1778 – 1844
 Hara Zaishō (原在照) 1813 – 1872
 Hara Zaisen (原在泉) 1849 – 1916
 Hara Zaikan (原在寛) 1884 – 1957
 Hara Arinao (原在修) 1922 – unknown

See also 
 Royal Ontario Museum
 Yamato-e
 Hara school of painters
 Female Ghost (Kunisada) - print in same gallery
 Unit 88-9 (Kiyomizu Masahiro) - sculpture in same gallery
 Fan print with two bugaku dancers (Kunisada) - print in same collection
 Ichikawa Omezō as a Pilgrim and Ichikawa Yaozō as a Samurai (Toyokuni I) - print in same gallery
 Eijudō Hibino at Seventy-one (Toyokuni I) - print in same collection
 View of Tempōzan Park in Naniwa (Gochōtei Sadamasu)

Notes

References 
 Baird, Merrily. Symbols of Japan: Thematic Motifs in Art and Design. New York: Rizzoli International Publications, Inc., 2001.
 Bowie, Henry P. On the Laws of Japanese Painting: An Introduction to the Study of the Art of Japan. Project Guttenberg release date March 16, 2011 Ebook #35580 https://www.gutenberg.org/files/35580/35580-h/35580-h.html
 Imperial Household Agency. "Sento Imperial Palace." Accessed May 1, 2013. http://sankan.kunaicho.go.jp/english/guide/sento.html
 Kotobank. "原在照 [Hara Zaishō]." Kotobank.jp. Accessed May 1, 2013. http://kotobank.jp/word/原在照
 Martin, John H. and Phyllis G. Kyoto: A Cultural Guide. Tokyo: Tuttle Publishing, 2002.
 Newboldt, Sir Henry John and Charles Hanbury-Williams. The Monthly Review, Volume 10. John Murray, 1908.
 Sato, Shozo. The Art of Sumi-e: Appreciation, Techniques, and Application. New York: Kodansha International Ltd., 1984.
 Screech, Simon. Obtaining Images: Art, Production and Display in Edo Japan. Honolulu: University of Hawai’i Press, 2012.
 Singer, Robert T. Edo: Art in Japan 1615-1868. Washington: National Gallery of Art, 1998.

External links
Prince Takamado Gallery of Japan, ROM website
Kyoto Imperial Palace cherry blossoms, Hara Zaishō

Japanese paintings
Collections of the Royal Ontario Museum
Landscape paintings